Bettina Wiegmann (born 7 October 1971) is a German former footballer who played as a midfielder.

Wiegmann scored 51 goals in 154 caps for the Germany national team between 1989 and 2003. In 1997, she was selected German Female Footballer of the Year.

Career statistics

International goals
Scores and results list Germany's goal tally first, score column indicates score after each Wiegmann goal.

Matches and goals scored at World Cup and Olympic tournaments
Bettina Wiegmann competed in four FIFA Women's World Cup:
China 1991,
Sweden 1995,
USA 1999
and USA 2003;
and two Olympics:
1996 Summer Olympic Games,
and 2000 Summer Olympic Games;
played 30 matches and scored 14 goals. Along with her Germany teams, Wiegmann is a world champion from USA 2003, runner-up from Sweden 1995; and a bronze medalist at the 2000 Summer Olympic Games.

Honours
Germany
 FIFA Women's World Cup: 2003
 Football at the Summer Olympics: bronze medal 2000
 UEFA Women's Championship: 1991, 1995, 1997, 2001

References

Match reports

External links
 

1971 births
Living people
German women's footballers
Germany women's international footballers
Footballers at the 1996 Summer Olympics
Footballers at the 2000 Summer Olympics
Olympic bronze medalists for Germany
German football managers
People from Euskirchen
Sportspeople from Cologne (region)
FIFA Century Club
Olympic medalists in football
1991 FIFA Women's World Cup players
1995 FIFA Women's World Cup players
1999 FIFA Women's World Cup players
2003 FIFA Women's World Cup players
FIFA Women's World Cup-winning captains
FIFA Women's World Cup-winning players
Medalists at the 2000 Summer Olympics
Olympic footballers of Germany
UEFA Women's Championship-winning players
Women's association football midfielders
Footballers from North Rhine-Westphalia
Boston Breakers (WUSA) players
Women's United Soccer Association players